Li Jianzhen (1907 – March 30, 1992) was a female People's Republic of China politician. She was born in Fengshun County, Guangdong. A follower of Peng Pai, she participated in the Guangzhou Uprising of 1927. As a member of the Chinese Red Army, she was active in Changting County, Fujian, which was part of the Jiangxi–Fujian Soviet. At the end of the Long March, she arrived in Shaanbei and was in the border region of Shaanxi, Gansu and Ningxia during the Second Sino-Japanese War. She later returned to her home province. She was a delegate to seven consecutive National People's Congresses, from the 1st (1954–1959) to the 7th (1988–1993). She died in Guangzhou.

References

1907 births
1992 deaths
People's Republic of China politicians from Guangdong
Chinese Communist Party politicians from Guangdong
Delegates to the 1st National People's Congress
Delegates to the 2nd National People's Congress
Delegates to the 3rd National People's Congress
Delegates to the 4th National People's Congress
Delegates to the 5th National People's Congress
Delegates to the 6th National People's Congress
Delegates to the 7th National People's Congress
Members of the Central Advisory Commission